The Wenceslas Bible or the Bible of Wenceslaus IV is a multi-volume illuminated biblical manuscript written in the German language. The manuscript was commissioned by the King Wenceslaus IV of Bohemia (that time also the King of the Romans) and made in Prague in the 1390s. The Wenceslas Bible is unique and very precious not only because of its text, which is one of the earliest German translations of the Bible, but also because of its splendid illuminations. This oldest German deluxe Bible manuscript remained uncompleted.

Historical context 

The Wenceslas Bible contains the text of one of the earliest Bible translations into German. The translation from the Latin Vulgata was commissioned by the wealthy burgher of Prague Martin Rotlev about 1375–1380.

Although Wenceslas' father Emperor Charles IV forbade Bible translations from Latin into vernacular languages as heresy in 1369, king Wenceslas with his second wife Sophia disrespected his father's order by their patronage of this spectacular edition of the new German Bible translation. Their own patronage confirms an inscription in the manuscript. It indicates the close relationship between the Bohemian royal court and the nascent Bohemian Reformation.

The Wenceslas Bible was never completed. The Book of Daniel, the Minor Prophets and the Books of Maccabees are lacking from the Old Testament and the New Testament was not even begun. The Bible contains 654 miniatures and initials; some were only scratched. The scribe left free spaces for more than 900 other illustrations. If the Bible were completed, it would have comprised about 1,800 leaves with circa 2,000 illuminations and would accordingly have surpassed all other medieval manuscripts in length, dimensions and wealth of artistic ornament.

Gallery

References

External links

 Austrian National Library official website

14th-century illuminated manuscripts
14th-century biblical manuscripts
Illuminated biblical manuscripts
Biblical manuscripts of the Austrian National Library
Bible translations into German
Czech manuscripts